Groveland is an unincorporated community in Tazewell County, Illinois, United States. It has a small library, a school which is now a church, gas station, war memorial, country store with restaurant and chapel, churches, Pyramid Printing Inc. and a handful of other small businesses. It has approximately 1400 residents and is located near Pekin and Morton. It lies within ten miles of Peoria, near Springfield Road and Edgewater Drive, which is Illinois State Route 98.

Notable people
 Catherine Amanda Coburn (1839–1913), journalist, newspaper editor
 Harlan Tarbell (1890-1960), magician, artist, author
 Abigail Scott Duniway (1834–1915), writer on women's rights; Oregon pioneer.

References 

Unincorporated communities in Tazewell County, Illinois
Unincorporated communities in Illinois
Peoria metropolitan area, Illinois